Philippa "Pippa" Savage (born 15 March 1981 in Moree, New South Wales, Australia) is an Australian rower. She competed in the women's single sculls at the 2008 Summer Olympics. She did not compete at the 2012 Summer Olympics.

References

External links
 
 
 
 

1981 births
Living people
Australian female rowers
Olympic rowers of Australia
Rowers at the 2008 Summer Olympics
People from Moree, New South Wales
Sportswomen from New South Wales
21st-century Australian women